Tropidofusus aequilonius is a species of large sea snail, marine gastropod mollusk in the family Columbariidae.

Description

Distribution
This species occurs in the Bering Sea.

References

 Sysoev A.V. 2000. A new species of Columbariinae (Gastropoda, Turbinellidae) from the Bering Sea. Ruthenica 10(1): 72-74

External links
  Harasewych M.G. (2018). Tropidofusus ypotethys: a new genus and new species of Columbariidae (Mollusca: Gastropoda: Turbinelloidea). Molluscan Research. DOI: 10.1080/13235818.2018.1484265: 1-11

Turbinellidae
Gastropods described in 2000